Acraga isothea is a moth in the family Dalceridae. It was described by Paul Dognin in 1914. It is found in Costa Rica and Panama. The habitat consists of tropical premontane wet and rain forests.

References

Moths described in 1914
Dalceridae